Dumaran Island is an island in the province of Palawan in the Philippines. It is around 34.1 kilometers away from the Palawan mainland and is accessible by pumpboats. The island is administratively divided between the municipalities of Dumaran and Araceli. Both municipalities' poblacions are located on the island. Dumaran Channel can be found west of the island. The Dalanganem islands can be found northeast of Dumaran.

Its antipode is located in Brazil.

Dumaran Bay
Dumaran Bay is located on the western part of the island. This is a list of structures and places there:
San Juan Bautista Catholic Church
Damuran Public Market
Castro Inn
Cayao Lodging House

Wasao
Maraneg Beach is in the southern portion of Wasao. It is said to have grayish-beige sand surrounded by forest. Red seaweed and coral is a common find to be washed up along the beach.

Wonol
Wonol is a peninsula located in the mid south region of the island

Fauna
Dumaran's fauna includes the Philippine cockatoo and the endangered Philippine pond turtle. The damselfish Pomacentrus tripunctatus can be found here.

References

Islands of Palawan